Minde may refer to:

Places
Minde (Alcanena), a freguesia or civil parish in Portugal
Minde, Bergen, a neighborhood in Bergen, Norway

People
Cheng Minde or M. T. Cheng (1917–1998), Chinese mathematician
Espen Minde (born 1983), Norwegian footballer
Kristine Minde (born 1992), Norwegian footballer
Kristin Minde (born 1982), Norwegian pop singer and musician
Kåre Minde (1930/31–2003), Norwegian politician
Wang Minde (born 1965), Chinese-American actor

Other
Minde, the Swahili word for the Abbott's duiker, an antelope found in Tanzania
the title character of Grete Minde, a 1977 Austrian-German drama film

See also
Mindy (disambiguation)